Richelle Montoya-Chee is an American politician who is the 11th vice president of the Navajo Nation. She is the first woman elected to the executive office of Navajo Nation.

Montoya is from Torreon, Sandoval County, New Mexico and is Hashtł'ishnii (Mud clan) and born for Ta'neeszahnii (Tangle clan). Her maternal grandfather is Kinłichii'nii (Red House clan), and her paternal grandfather is Táchii'nii (Red Running into Water clan).

She served as the president of the Torreon/Star Lake Chapter and is a member of the Na’ Neelzhiin Ji Olta’ Inc. board. In August 2022, Montoya was selected as the running mate of Buu Nygren during the 2022 Navajo Nation presidential election.

Montoya is an advocate for the usage of the Navajo language.

She is married to U.S. Army veteran Olsen Chee.

References 

Living people
Year of birth missing (living people)
Place of birth missing (living people)
21st-century American women politicians
21st-century Native American women
21st-century Native American politicians
Vice Presidents of the Navajo Nation
Native American women in politics
Women in New Mexico politics
Native American people from New Mexico
21st-century American politicians
People from Sandoval County, New Mexico